Places and Names: On War, Revolution, and Returning is a memoir written by Elliot Ackerman. It was on the New York Times' "10 New Books We Recommend" list in August 2019, and was nominated for the 2020 Andrew Carnegie Medal for Excellence in Non-Fiction.

Overview 
In Places and Names, Ackerman shares stories of his deployments as a Marine in Afghanistan and Iraq, as well as his travels in and near Syria as a journalist after leaving the military.

References 

Military memoirs
Memoirs